E. H. Amonoo-Neizer Ph.D is a Ghanaian academic and a former Vice Chancellor of the Kwame Nkrumah University of Science and Technology (KNUST).

Term as Vice Chancellor
Amonoo-Neizer served as Vice Chancellor of KNUST from 1992 to 1997.

References

Living people
Vice-Chancellors of the Kwame Nkrumah University of Science and Technology
Year of birth missing (living people)
Academic staff of Kwame Nkrumah University of Science and Technology